The Northern League was a neo-Nazi organisation founded by Roger Pearson. It was active in the United Kingdom and in northern continental Europe in the latter half of the 20th century.

History 
Roger Pearson formed the Northern League in collaboration with Peter Huxley-Blythe, who was active in a variety of neo-Nazi groups with connections in Germany and North America. The League published the  periodical The Northlander.

The stated purpose was to save the "Nordic race" from "annihilation of our kind" and to "fight for survival against forces which would mongrelize our race and civilization". The Northern League merged newsletters with Britons Publishing Company, an anti-Semitic publisher and a major distributor of the Protocols of the Elders of Zion.

Leading members of the Northern League included the Nazi racial eugenicist Hans F. K. Günther, who continued his work in the post-war period under a pseudonym. Other active members included the founder of Mankind Quarterly, Robert Gayre, and its editors Robert E. Kuttner and Donald A. Swan; the American segregationist Earnest Sevier Cox, the ex–Waffen SS officer and post-war neo-Nazi leader Arthur Ehrhardt, and a number of post-war British fascists, though even among fascists, the Northern League was considered extremist. Among its co-founders and activists was Alastair Harper, the United Kingdom Independence Party (UKIP) parliamentary candidate in Dunfermline West in 2001.

Northern League literature was written in the style of scientific racism (e.g., the work of Pearson's collaborator Raymond B. Cattell) and its Statement of Aims reflects 19th-century conceptions of Rasse and Volk. Andrew S. Winston of the University of Guelph writes in an analysis of this group:

According to the "Aims", Northern Europeans are the "purest survival of the great Indo-European family of nations, sometimes described as the Caucasian race and at other times as the Aryan race". Almost all the "classic civilisations of the past were the product of these Indo-European peoples". Intermarriage with conquered peoples was said to produce the decay of these civilizations, particularly through interbreeding with slaves. "The rising tide of Color" threatens to overwhelm European society, and would result in the "biological annihilation of the subspecies", according to the Northern League.

References 

 Billig, M. (1979). Psychology, Racism, and Fascism. Birmingham: A. F. & R./Searchlight.
 Pearson, R. (1959). "Editorial: Our third birthday". Northern World, 4, 1–4. (Copy available in Herbert C. Sanborn Papers, Special Collections, Vanderbilt University)
 Tauber, K. (1967). Beyond Eagle and Swastika: German Nationalism Since 1945 (two vols.). Middletown, CT: Wesleyan University Press.

Neo-Nazi organisations in the United Kingdom